Douglas Lawrence McWeeny (August 17, 1896 – January 1, 1953) was a pitcher in Major League Baseball. He pitched from 1921–1930. He pitched right-handed. 

McWeeny made his big-league debut on April 24, 1921, and won three games for the Chicago White Sox that season. His best year came in 1928 with the Brooklyn Robins, with a 14-14 record that included a National League-best four shutouts. He also led the NL in walks that season (114), and had a league-worst 11 wild pitches in 1929, a year before his career came to an end.

Nicknamed Buzz, McWeeny worked as a service station attendant in the off-season.

References

External links

1896 births
1953 deaths
Baseball players from Illinois
Major League Baseball pitchers
Brooklyn Robins players
Chicago White Sox players
Cincinnati Reds players
Milwaukee Brewers (minor league) players
Evansville Evas players
San Francisco Seals (baseball) players
Minneapolis Millers (baseball) players